Combermere Barracks, Windsor, is a British military installation  from Windsor Castle.

History
The original barracks, known as Clewer Barracks, were designed to accommodate the Royal Horse Guards and were built at Clewer Park between 1796 and 1800. Queen Victoria ordered the replacement of the barracks after a personal visit in 1864 exposed to her its unhygienic conditions.

The barracks were renovated in 2006 and became the home of the Household Cavalry Regiment.

The Household Cavalry Regiment moved from Combermere Barracks to Bulford Camp in May 2019. No. 18 Troop and the training wing
remained in Windsor. The 1st Battalion, Welsh Guards will be moving in and will join London District to start their ceremonial duties.

Based units 
The following notable units are based at Combermere Barracks.

British Army 
Household Cavalry

 Household Cavalry Regiment
No.18 Troop
Training Wing

Royal Armoured Corps

 The Royal Yeomanry 
 3 Troop, C (Kent and Sharpshooters Yeomanry) Squadron – Windsor (Army Reserve)

Guards Division

 1st Battalion, Welsh Guards (Public Duties battalion under London District)
Headquarters Company
No.1 (Prince of Wales')
No.2 Company
No.3 (Little Iron Men) Company
Support Company

References

Installations of the British Army
Windsor Castle
Barracks in England
Buildings and structures in Windsor, Berkshire
Household Cavalry